John Baptist Cashel Hoey,  (Baptised 17 July 1827 – 7 January 1892) was an Irish writer, editor, and public servant for colonial New Zealand and Australia.

Hoey was born in 1827, the eldest son of Cashel Fitzsimons Hoey, of Dundalk, County Louth, Ireland, and Charleston, South Carolina. He was educated at St. Patrick's College, Armagh, and was one of the principal writers for the Nation, and editor 1849–57, taking over from Charles Gavan Duffy, and was one of the "Young Irelanders". From 1865 to 1878 he was sub-editor of the Dublin Review. He was called to the bar at the Middle Temple in 1861.

Hoey was a member of the board of advice and secretary to the Agent-General for Victoria 1872–73 being appointed by Gavan Duffy, and secretary to the Agent-General for New Zealand 1874–79, since when he had been secretary to the Agent-General for Victoria. He was secretary to the London committees for the Melbourne International Exhibition in 1880 and 1888, and to the Colonial Museums Committee.

Personal life
Hoey married, on 9 February 1858, Frances Sarah Stewart (née Johnston). She was the widow of Adam Murray Stewart, of Cromleich, Dublin, who survived him. As Frances Cashel Hoey, she was a well-known author and translator. The couple had no children.

John Cashel Hoey died in London in 1892, aged 63.

Honours
His honours included Knight of the Orders of Malta, d'Este, Pius IX., Francis I., and El Caridad, and a Fellow of the Roman Academy of the Catholic Religion. He was named Companion of the Order of St Michael and St George (CMG), which was conferred in 1881 for his services on behalf of the International Exhibit in Melbourne in 1880.

Arms

References

1828 births
1892 deaths
19th-century Irish people
Irish barristers
Companions of the Order of St Michael and St George
New Zealand public servants
Public servants of Victoria (Australia)